Diprafenone is an antiarrhythmic beta adrenergic antagonist.

References

Beta blockers
Aromatic ketones